Purandhara is a town and Village Development Committee  in Dang Deokhuri District in Lumbini Province of south-western Nepal, near to Salyan. At the time of the 1991 Nepal census it had a population of 11,981 persons living in 2033 individual households.  It is notable as the home of Chandra Bahadur Dangi, the shortest man in the world.

References

External links
UN map of the municipalities of Dang Deokhuri District

Populated places in Dang District, Nepal